Plasmapheresis (from the Greek πλάσμα, plasma, something molded, and ἀφαίρεσις aphairesis, taking away) is the removal, treatment, and return or exchange of blood plasma or components thereof from and to the blood circulation. It is thus an extracorporeal therapy, a medical procedure performed outside the body.

Three general types of plasmapheresis can be distinguished:
 Autologuous, removing blood plasma, treating it in some way, and returning it to the same person, as a therapy.
 Exchange, a patient's blood plasma is removed, while blood products are given in replacement. This type is called plasma exchange (PE, PLEX, or PEX) or plasma exchange therapy (PET). The removed plasma is discarded and the patient receives replacement donor plasma, albumin, or a combination of albumin and saline (usually 70% albumin and 30% saline).
 Donation, removing blood plasma, separating its components, and returning some of them to the same person, while holding out others to become blood products that this person donates for those in need. In such a plasma donation procedure, blood is removed from the body, blood cells and plasma are separated, and the blood cells are returned, while the plasma is collected and frozen to preserve it for eventual use as fresh frozen plasma or as an ingredient in the manufacture of blood products.

Plasmapheresis of the autologous and exchange types is used to treat a variety of disorders, including those of the immune system, such as Goodpasture's syndrome, Guillain–Barré syndrome, lupus, myasthenia gravis, and thrombotic thrombocytopenic purpura.

Medical uses 
During plasmapheresis, blood, which consists of blood cells and a clear liquid called blood plasma, is initially taken out of the body through a needle or previously implanted catheter. Plasma is then removed from the blood by a cell separator. Three procedures are commonly used to separate the plasma from the blood cells, with each method having its own advantages and disadvantages:
 Discontinuous flow centrifugation: One venous catheter line is required. Typically, a 300 ml batch of blood is removed at a time and centrifuged to separate plasma from blood cells.
 Continuous flow centrifugation: Two venous lines are used. This method requires slightly less blood volume out of the body at any one time, as it is able to continuously spin out plasma.
 Plasma filtration: Two venous lines are used. The plasma is filtered using standard hemodialysis equipment. This continuous process requires that less than 100 ml of blood be outside the body at one time.

After plasma separation, the blood cells are returned to the person undergoing treatment, while the plasma, which contains the antibodies, is first treated and then returned to the patient in traditional plasmapheresis. Rarely, other replacement fluids, such as hydroxyethyl starch, may be used in individuals who object to blood transfusion but these are rarely used due to severe side-effects. Medication to keep the blood from clotting (an anticoagulant) is given to the patient during the procedure.

Plasmapheresis is used as a therapy in particular diseases. It is an uncommon treatment in the United States, but it is more common in Europe and particularly Japan.

An important use of plasmapheresis is in the therapy of autoimmune disorders, where the rapid removal of disease-causing autoantibodies from the circulation is required in addition to other medical therapy. It is important to note that plasma exchange therapy in and of itself is useful to temper the disease process, while simultaneous medical and immunosuppressive therapy is required for long-term management. Plasma exchange offers the quickest short-term answer to removing harmful autoantibodies; however, the production of autoantibodies by the immune system must also be suppressed, usually by the use of medications such as cyclophosphamide, cyclosporine, mycophenolate mofetil, prednisone, rituximab, or a mixture of these.

Other uses are the removal of blood proteins where these are overly abundant and cause hyperviscosity syndrome.

There is weak evidence that TPE might be of benefit in severe cases of COVID-19.

Examples of diseases that have been treated with plasmapheresis

 Acute disseminated encephalomyelitis (ADEM)
 Antiphospholipid antibody syndrome (APS or APLS)
 Behcet syndrome
 Chronic inflammatory demyelinating polyneuropathy
 Down syndrome Regression Disorder 
 Goodpasture's syndrome
 Granulomatosis with polyangiitis
 Graves' disease in infants and neonates
 Guillain–Barré syndrome
 HELLP syndrome
 HIV-related neuropathy
 Hyperviscosity syndromes:
 Cryoglobulinemia
 Paraproteinemia
 Waldenström macroglobulinemia
 Idiopathic pulmonary fibrosis
 Lambert-Eaton syndrome
 Microscopic polyangiitis
 Miller Fisher syndrome
 Multiple sclerosis
 Myasthenia gravis
 Neuromyelitis optica
 Opsoclonus myoclonus syndrome
 PANDAS syndrome (experimental, unproven)
 Pemphigus vulgaris
 Recurrent focal and segmental glomerulosclerosis in the transplanted kidney
 Refsum disease
 Rhabdomyolysis
 Systemic sclerosis (scleroderma)
 Thrombotic thrombocytopenic purpura (TTP) / hemolytic uremic syndrome
 Toxic epidermal necrolysis (TEN)
 Transverse myelitis

Complications of plasmapheresis therapy
Though plasmapheresis is helpful in certain medical conditions, like any other therapy, there are potential risks and complications. Insertion of a rather large intravenous catheter can lead to bleeding, lung puncture (depending on the site of catheter insertion), and, if the catheter is left in too long, it can get infected.

Aside from placing the catheter, the procedure itself has complications. When patient blood is outside of the body passing through the plasmapheresis machine, the blood has a tendency to clot. To reduce this tendency, in one common protocol, sodium citrate is infused while the blood is running through the circuit. Citrate binds to calcium in the blood, calcium being essential for blood to clot. Citrate is very effective in preventing blood from clotting; however, its use can lead to life-threateningly low calcium levels. This can be detected using the Chvostek's sign or Trousseau's sign. To prevent this complication, calcium is infused intravenously while the patient is undergoing the plasmapheresis; in addition, calcium supplementation by mouth may also be given.

Other complications include:
 Bleeding or hematoma from needle placement
 Hypotension
 Potential exposure to blood products, with risk of transfusion reactions or transfusion transmitted diseases
 Suppression of the patient's immune system

Donation procedure

Donating plasma is similar in many ways to whole blood donation, though the end product is used for different purposes.  Most plasmapheresis is for fractionation into other products; other blood donations are transfused with relatively minor modifications.  Plasma that is collected solely for further manufacturing is called Source Plasma.

Plasma donors undergo a screening process to ensure both the donor's safety and the safety of the collected product.  Factors monitored include blood pressure, pulse, temperature, total protein, protein electrophoresis, health history screening similar to that for whole blood, as well as an annual physical exam with a licensed physician or an approved physician substitute under the supervision of the physician. Donors are screened at each donation for viral diseases that can be transmitted by blood, sometimes by multiple methods.  For example, donations are tested for HIV by ELISA, which shows if they have been exposed to the disease, as well as by nucleic acid methods (PCR or similar) to rule out recent infections that the ELISA test might miss and are also screened for hepatitis B and hepatitis C. Industry standards require at least two sets of negative test results before the collected plasma is used for injectable products.  The plasma is also treated in processing multiple times to inactivate any virus that was undetected during the screening process.

In a few countries, plasma (like blood) is donated by unpaid volunteers. In others, including the United States, Austria, Germany and some Canadian facilities plasma donors are paid for their donations. Standards for donating plasma are set by national regulatory agencies such as the U.S. Food and Drug Administration (FDA), the European Union, and by a professional organization, the Plasma Protein Therapeutics Association (or PPTA), which audits and accredits collection facilities. A National Donor Deferral Registry (NDDR) is also maintained by the PPTA for use in keeping donors with prior positive viral antibody test results from donating at any facility.

Almost all plasmapheresis in the US is performed by automated methods. In some cases, automated plasmapheresis is used to collect plasma products like fresh frozen plasma for direct transfusion purposes, often at the same time as plateletpheresis. These procedures are performed at facilities such as community blood centers.

Since returning red cells causes the body to replace plasma more rapidly, a donor can provide up to a liter of plasma at a time and can donate with only a few days between donations, unlike the 56-day deferral for blood donation. The amount allowed in a donation varies vastly from country to country, but generally does not exceed two donations, each as much as a liter (one-third of the total plasma volume), per seven-day period. If a significant amount of red blood cells cannot be returned, the donor may not donate for 56 days, just as if they had donated a unit of blood.  Depending on the collection system and the operation, the removed plasma may be replaced by saline.  The body typically replaces the collected volume within 24 hours, and donors typically donate up to twice a week, though this varies by country.

The collected plasma is promptly frozen at lower than -20 °C (-4 °F) and is typically shipped to a processing facility for fractionation. This process separates the collected plasma into specific components, such as albumin and immunoglobulins, most of which are made into medications for human use. Sometimes the plasma is thawed and transfused as Fresh Frozen Plasma (FFP), much like the plasma from a normal blood donation.

 Manual method
 For the manual method, approximately the same as a whole blood donation is collected from the donor. The collected blood is then separated by centrifuge machines in separate rooms, the plasma is pressed out of the collection set into a satellite container, and the red blood cells are returned to the donor.
 The danger with this method was that if the wrong red blood cells were returned to the donor, a serious and potentially fatal transfusion reaction could occur. Requiring donors to recite their names and ID numbers on returned bags of red cells minimized this risk. This procedure has largely become obsolete in favor of the automated method.
 Automated method

 The automated method uses a very similar process. The difference is that the collection, separation, and return are all performed inside a machine connected to the donor through a needle in the arm, typically the antecubital vein. There is no risk of receiving the wrong red cells. The devices used are very similar to the devices used for therapeutic plasmapheresis, and the potential for citrate toxicity is similar. The potential risks are explained to prospective donors at the first donation, and most donors tolerate the procedure well. In the UK in 2020, plasma donation is sought from volunteers who have recovered from COVID-19. The process takes 560 ml (two units) of plasma in five or six consecutive cycles of about 100 ml per cycle over a period of approximately an hour.
 Antibodies
 Donors are sometimes immunized against agents such as tetanus or hepatitis B so that their plasma contains the antibodies against the toxin or disease.  In other donors, an intentionally incompatible unit of blood is transfused to produce antibodies to the antigens on the red cells.  The collected plasma then contains these components, which are used in manufacturing of medications. Donors who are already ill may have their plasma collected for use as a positive control for laboratory testing.

History 

Plasmapheresis was originally described by doctors Vadim A. Yurevick and Nicolay Rosenberg of the Imperial Medical and Surgical Academy of Saint Petersburg in 1913. and John Abel and Leonard Rowntree of Johns Hopkins Hospital in 1914. Both studies carried out on animals, are considered precedent to subsequent studies held in humans and offered the first description of the technique. The first studies of the effects of plasmapheresis on humans were undertaken during the WWII period, and the results were reported in a study over six plasma donors presented by doctors Co Tui, F.C. Bartter and A.M. Wright in 1944.

Aware of the rising demand for plasma for transfusion, Dr. Josep Antoni Grífols-Lucas conducted the first systematic study of the application of plasmapheresis in a series of plasma donors. Performed in 1951, this was the most exhaustive study to date of the medium-term effects on the human body, and involved more than 320 plasmapheresis procedures. Grifols-Lucas concluded that it was possible for donors to undergo plasmapheresis on a weekly basis without the quality of their plasma suffering, while the method also made it possible to obtain a larger quantity of plasma when compared to the conventional method of whole blood donation. The results of the study were presented at the 4th International Congress of Blood Transfusion in Lisbon (1951), and were published in 1952 in the British Medical Journal and Medicina Clínica in Spain.

At the Lisbon congress, Grifols-Lucas met Edwin Cohn. While Grifols-Lucas was presenting a safe technique for obtaining large quantities of plasma from healthy donors, Cohn presented a plasma fractionator, a device that separated out the proteins contained in plasma. These two major contributions marked the birth of a new industry: plasma fractionation to obtain plasma products. In 1955, further data were presented at the 5th Congress of the European Hematology Society, in Freiburg, Germany, based on the ongoing performance of plasmapheresis over a five-year period. In 1956 Grifols-Lucas presented the results at the 6th Congress of the International Hematology Society in Boston, US.

Michael Rubinstein was the first to use plasmapheresis to treat an immune-related disorder when he saved the life of an adolescent boy with thrombotic thrombocytopenic purpura (TTP) at the Cedars of Lebanon Hospital in Los Angeles in 1959. The modern plasmapheresis process itself originated in the U.S. National Cancer Institute between 1963 and 1968, where investigators drew upon an old dairy creamer separation technology first used in 1878 and refined by Edwin Cohn's centrifuge marketed in 1953.

In 1965, Dr. Víctor Grifols-Lucas, brother of Josep Antoni Grifols-Lucas, patented the device, along with the procedure for performing plasmapheresis in situ, that is, with the donor present. This replaced a fragmented, manual process with a continuous automatic method which enabled blood components to be extracted, separated and returned to the donor in a single procedure. The new device made plasmapheresis faster and simpler, and also made it safer for donors.

See also 
 Apheresis
 Leukoreduction
 Venipuncture

References

External links 
 American Society for Apheresis

Blood products
Medical treatments
Nephrology procedures
Transfusion medicine